The American intelligence analysts who compiled the justifications for continuing to detain the captives taken in the "war on terror" made dozens of references to al Qaida safe houses, in Karachi, Pakistan.

Some of the references:
refer to instances when important documents, particularly various lists of individuals, were captured in al Qaida safe houses, or al Qaida guest houses, in Karachi.  A list of 324 Arabic names, associated with senior al Qaida operative Khalid Sheikh Mohammed, being one of the most commonly referenced.
refer to instances when suspects were captured in an al Qaida safe house in Karachi.  The bin Attash brothers, who were interrogated in the CIA's archipelago of covert black sites, were captured in a Karachi safe house.
refer to instances when a suspect temporarily stayed in a Karachi safe house or guest house.

According to the 9-11 Commission Khalid Sheikh Mohammed rented a safe house in Karachi specifically to house the men who would later hijack the jetliners on September 11, 2001.
The 9-11 Commission reported that Mohammed rented the safe house with funds from Osama bin Laden.

Captured in a Karachi safe house or guest house
American and Pakistani counter-terrorism officials conducted an extensive series of raids, across Pakistan, on September 11, 2002, the first anniversary of the attacks of September 11, 2001.  Suspected safe houses and guesthouses in Karachi and Faisalabad were particular targets.
Several of the captives captured on September 11, 2002 were of sufficient intelligence value that they were interrogated first in one of the CIA's archipelago of black sites, in particular the dark prison.

Some other captives were captured in suspect safe houses or guest houses in Karachi on other dates.  And yet other captive's documents state that they were captured in a Karachi safe house or guest house, without specifying the date it occurred.  Captives said to have been captured in a Karachi safe house include: Shawki Awad Balzuhair,
Ha Il Aziz Ahmed Al Maythali
Hassan Mohammed Ali Bin Attash,
Sabri Mohammed Ebrahim Al Qurashi

Listed on a suspicious document seized in Karachi
Many of the captives in Guantanamo learned from the allegations they faced during their Combatant Status Review Tribunals or Administrative Review Board hearings that their continued detention was being justified because their name, or "known alias", was found on a suspicious list.
The ambiguous wording American intelligence analysts used when describing the suspicious lists leaves open to speculation how many lists there actually were.

Captives whose names were alleged to have been found on a list captured in a Karachi safe house include:
Omar Rajab Amin,
Yusif Khalil Abdallah Nur
Mohammad Ahmed Abdullah Saleh Al Hanashi
Yusef Abdullah Saleh Al Rabiesh
Buad Thif Allah Al Atabi
Khalid Abd Jal Jabbar Muhammad Juthman Al Qadasi
Riyad Atiq Ali Abdu Al Haj Al Radai
Ziyad bin Salih bin Muhammad Al Bahooth
Rami Bin Said Al Taibi
Abdullah Kamel Abdullah Kamel Al Kandari
Faiz Al Kandari
Walid Said Bin Said Zaid
Abdul Hakim Abdul Rahman Abdulaziz Al Mousa.

Karachi safehouses managed by Abdul Al-Rahim Ghulam Rabbani
Abdul Al-Rahim Ghulam Rabbani, a Guantanamo captive transferred to Guantanamo in 2004, after two years in CIA custody, faced over two dozen allegations associated with his management of six safe houses in Karachi between 2000 and his capture on September 11, 2002.
Intelligence analysts alleged the safe houses he managed were used as underground hospitals for fighters injured in Afghanistan.
They alleged the safe houses had been used as an underground factory for the manufacture of the timers for time-bombs, and that five of the USS Cole bombers and seventeen of the nineteen hijackers in the September 11 attacks had stayed there.

Connection to the murder of American journalist Daniel Pearl
Yosri Fouda, Al Jazeera's London bureau chief, interviewed Khalid Sheikh Mohammed in April 2002 in a Karachi safe house.
According to Jane Mayer, writing for The New Yorker,
Fouda was "astounded" at the lack of concern Mohammed showed for his personal security, during and after the interview.  She reported that Mohammed escorted Fouda downstairs and onto the street, following the interview.
During this interview in the Karachi safe house Mohammed gave Fouda an unedited copy of the video of the beheading of American journalist Daniel Pearl.
Pearl had been kidnapped and beheaded by jihadists in February 2002, in Karachi, two months prior to the interview.
While Khalid Sheikh Mohammed was, eventually, to confess to beheading Pearl, when subjected to "extended interrogation methods" in CIA custody, he did not take credit for the beheading when interviewed by Fouda.

In July 2002 Khalid Sheikh Mohammed lived in a four bedroom safe house in Karachi.
It contained three laptops and five cell phones.

Saud Memon, a wealthy Karachi industrialist owned the building where Pearl was held, killed and buried.
He disappeared while living outside Pakistan in March 2003.
He was found near his family home in Karachi four years later on April 28, 2007.
He was emaciated, infected with meningitis, and unable to speak, or to recognize members of his family.
He died three weeks later, on May 18, 2007, without offering an account of his missing four years.
He was widely reported to have been apprehended by American security officials.

References

Al-Qaeda safe houses
Al-Qaeda facilities
Buildings and structures in Karachi
Safe houses in Pakistan